Isaka may refer to the following people:
Given name
Isaka Cernak (born 1989), Australian football player 

Surname
Kōtarō Isaka (born 1971), Japanese author of mystery fiction 
Mito Isaka (born 1976), Japanese football forward
Pixley ka Isaka Seme (c. 1881–1951), the first black lawyer in South Africa
Tatsuya Isaka (born 1985), Japanese actor 
Teppei Isaka (born 1974), Japanese football player

See also
Issaka
Isakas

Japanese-language surnames